The Rock in Rome (until its 2008 edition known as Romarock Festival) is a musical event that takes place annually in Rome at the Capannelle Racecourse usually at the turn of the months of June and July . Does not take place as a classic festival (i.e., it is not of one or more consecutive days in which more groups perform) but as a musical event in which, over a period of a month or so, several groups perform.

Among the artists, Mark Knopfler, Slash, The Chemical Brothers, Jamiroquai, Ben Harper, Toto, Korn,
Thirty Seconds to Mars, Skunk Anansie, Franz Ferdinand, The Killers, Cranberries, Nine Inch Nails, Motörhead, ZZ Top, The Cure, Testament, Duran Duran, Dream Theater, Radiohead, Franco Battiato, Caparezza, Subsonica, Vinicio Capossela, Elio e Le Storie Tese, Litfiba, Rammstein, Atoms for Peace, Arctic Monkeys, Green Day, Blur, Iggy & The Stooges, Smashing Pumpkins, Bruce Springsteen.

Feature of the festival is the quality and variety of the line-up thus allowing the meeting of different cultures and musical genres.

During the three previous editions, more than 370,000 people have benefited from the setting Capannelle Racetrack taking part in shows and allowing the achievement dell'esaurito for several evenings.
The 2011 edition has seen a total of about two hundred thousand appearances.

Editions

2002

2003

2004

2005

2006

2007

2008

2009

2010

2011

2012

2013

See also

List of historic rock festivals

References

External links 
 Official Site
 RomaDailyNews - Update Events Calendar

Rock festivals in Italy
Music festivals established in 2002
Festivals in Rome